ABC Columbia can refer to:

KMIZ, the ABC television affiliate in Columbia, Missouri
WOLO-TV, the ABC television affiliate in Columbia, South Carolina